Kalac may refer to:

Antun Kalac (1849–1919), Croatian writer, nationalist and priest
Željko Kalac (born 1972), Australian association football player of Croatian descent
 Kalac, Bileća, a village in the Bileća municipality, Bosnia and Herzegovina
 Kalac, Goražde, a village in the Goražde municipality, Bosnia and Herzegovina
 Kalac, Primorje-Gorski Kotar County, a village in the Mošćenička Draga municipality, Croatia
 Kalaç (disambiguation), a Turkish toponym and surname
 Sejo Kalač (born 1964), pop-folk singer from Montenegro

See also